The Baloué River (from Manding for "Red River") is a river in Mali in West Africa. It flows from a source west of Bamako to the Bakoy near Toukoto and forms part of the Senegal watershed.

In Manding languages, Baloué signifies 'red river', Bakoye 'white river' and Bafing 'black river'.

References

Rivers of Mali
Senegal River